Sportin' Life is the thirteenth studio album by American jazz fusion band Weather Report which was released in March 1985 through Columbia Records. Although featuring many more vocal performances than any of their previous studio albums, words are rare and most vocals are chants from guest musicians such as Bobby McFerrin or Carl Anderson. The album is named after a character from Porgy and Bess. In addition, Sportin' Life was to be the last Weather Report studio album but, given contractual obligations with Columbia, the band had to release a follow-up in 1986 which was titled This Is This!.

Track listing 

All tracks composed by Joe Zawinul; except where indicated:

 "Corner Pocket" – 5:46
 "Indiscretions" – 4:05
 "Hot Cargo" – 4:41
 "Confians" (Mino Cinélu) – 5:07
 "Pearl On the Half Shell" (Wayne Shorter) – 4:06
 "What's Going On" (Renaldo Benson, Alfred Cleveland, Marvin Gaye) – 6:29
 "Face on the Barroom Floor" (Wayne Shorter) – 3:59
 "Ice-Pick Willy" – 5:00

Personnel 

Weather Report:

 Josef Zawinul – keyboards
 Wayne Shorter – saxophones
 Omar Hakim – drums, background vocals on "Confians"
 Victor Bailey – bass, background vocals on "Confians"
 Mino Cinélu – percussion, lead vocals and acoustic guitar on "Confians"

Additional musicians:

 Bobby McFerrin – vocalist (tracks 1, 3, 5, 8)
 Carl Anderson – vocalist (tracks 1, 3, 8)
 Dee Dee Bellson – vocalist (tracks 1, 3, 8)
 Alfie Silas – voice (tracks 1, 3, 8)

Technical:

 Howard Siegel - engineer
 Tony Lane, Nancy Donald - art direction
 Jerry McDonald - album artwork

References

External links 

 Weather Report Annotated Discography: Sportin' Life

1985 albums
Columbia Records albums
Weather Report albums